Raksha may refer to:

Film and literature
Raksha (1982 film), a 1982 Hindi action film
Raksha (2008 film), a 2008 Telugu horror film
Rakshas (film), a 2018 Marathi fantasy film
Raksha (The Jungle Book), a character from Rudyard Kipling's The Jungle Book

People
Raksha Khadase (born 1987), Indian politician

Places
Ragsha, also known as Rakshā, a village in Iran

Religion and philosophy
Raksha Bandhan, an Indian religious festival
Raksha Sainyam, the Salvation Army in Kerala, India
Raksha (Vedic), a Hindu philosophical concept
Rakshasa, mythological being in Hinduism and Buddhism

Universities
Raksha Shakti University

See also
Rakshasa (disambiguation)